Belcher's Street is a main street in Kennedy Town of Hong Kong. It connects east Victoria Road and joins west Queen's Road West. A small section in its west end built a turn around for Hong Kong Tramways.

The street was named after Edward Belcher, a Canadian-born Royal Navy officer who surveyed the harbour of Hong Kong in 1841.

The former Western Fire Station, located at No. 12 Belcher's Street, was converted into the Po Leung Kuk Chan Au Big Yan Home for the Elderly. It is a Grade III historic building and is located along the Central and Western Heritage Trail.

See also
 List of streets and roads in Hong Kong
 Belcher Bay
 The Belcher's
 HKU station a station of the MTR, with one exit in Belcher's Street

References

External links

Google Maps of Belcher's Street

Roads on Hong Kong Island
Kennedy Town
Hong Kong Tramways